The UCD Law Review is an annual law journal edited by students of University College Dublin's Sutherland School of Law. The journal was established in 2001, and is published on an annual basis. It features articles on a variety of legal topics. The objective of the journal is to "publish articles by undergraduate and postgraduate students, along with practitioners, from within Ireland, and abroad".

External links
 

Irish law journals
University College Dublin
Publications established in 2001
Law journals edited by students
Annual journals
English-language journals